High Peak (also known as Peak Hill) is a hill which is partially eroded, resulting in a cliff face, on the English Channel coast to the southwest of Sidmouth, Devon, southern England. It is a partially eroded Iron Age hill fort, with pre-Roman and post Roman pottery found there.

History 
On the edge of the cliff there are the remains of significant earthworks, which have been variously shown as having Iron Age, Roman and Dark Age occupation. Geological study, and the lines of the earthworks suggest that the site once extended several tens of metres into what is now eroded away. General interpretation suggests that it was an Iron Age defensive site which saw re-use in the Dark Age period, perhaps as a coastal trading station.

Geology 
Within the cliffs below High Peak and Chit Rocks a number of very rare fossils of Triassic fish, reptiles and amphibians have been found.

There are four rock strata in the cliff face of High Peak. The "Otter Sandstone Formation" that forms the base of the cliffs were deposited in a hot dry climates in the Triassic Period about 220 Million years ago. The deposits in the centre of the cliff face are from the Mercia Mudstone Group and were formed about 200 Million years ago. 

Above these Triassic formations, there are layers of Upper Greensand, a Cretaceous rock formation about 80 Million years old. 

The top of High Peak is underlain by flint gravel that was probably left behind following the solution of an original cover of chalk during the early Paleogene period about 60 to 66 Million years ago.

References

Bibliography

Cliffs of England
Coasts of England
Geology of Devon
Hill forts in Devon
Hills of Devon
Jurassic Coast